Franziska Christine "Fränzi" Aufdenblatten (born 10 February 1981) is a retired Swiss World Cup alpine ski racer.

Born in Zermatt, Valais, Aufdenblatten made her World Cup debut in March 2000 in a giant slalom at Sestriere. She scored four podium finishes on the World Cup: one win in a super-G in Val-d'Isère in December 2009, and three third places in downhill at Haus im Ennstal (2004), Bad Kleinkirchheim (2006), and Lenzerheide (2014). Aufdenblatten competed in three Winter Olympics (2002, 2006 and 2014) and her best finish was a sixth place in the 2014 super-G at Rosa Khutor.

After the 2014 Games, Aufdenblatten announced that she would be retiring from competition at the end of the season in order to start a new career in sports management. After announcing her retirement, she scored a fourth and final World Cup podium finish with a third place in the downhill at the 2014 World Cup Finals at Lenzerheide in her native Switzerland.

World Cup victories

References

External links

 
 Fränzi Aufdenblatten World Cup standings at the International Ski Federation
 
 
 Swiss Ski team – official site – 
 Stöckli Skis – alpine racers – Fraenzi Aufdenblatten
  

1981 births
Swiss female alpine skiers
Alpine skiers at the 2002 Winter Olympics
Alpine skiers at the 2006 Winter Olympics
Alpine skiers at the 2014 Winter Olympics
Olympic alpine skiers of Switzerland
People from Zermatt
Living people
Sportspeople from Valais
21st-century Swiss women